Bordesley is a village north of Redditch, in Worcestershire, England.  Bordesley primarily comprises houses alongside the A441 Birmingham Road between Redditch and Alvechurch.  Bordesley is probably named for nearby Bordesley Abbey.

See also
Bordesley Abbey

References

Villages in Worcestershire